Archie P. McKishnie (June 20, 1875 – July 7, 1946) was a popular Canadian author and short story writer.

Biography
McKishnie was born on June 20, 1875 at Rondeau Point in New Scotland, Chatham-Kent, Ontario, and educated at Ridgetown Collegiate Institute. Before becoming a writer he was dramatic editor of the Sunday edition of The Toronto World newspaper. 
His stories have been categorized as historical fiction, nature stories, and juvenile stories. He was considered one of Canada's best nature writers of his day.

He was the brother of poet Jean Blewett.

He died at his home in Toronto on July 7, 1946.

McKishnie's archives are held by the William Ready Division of Archives and Research Collections at McMaster University.

Selected works

Gaff Linkum: A Tale of Talbotville. Toronto: Briggs, 1907. 255 p. 
Love of the Wild. Toronto: McLeod & Allen, 1910. 327 p. 
Willow, the Wisp. Toronto: Allen, 1918. 308 p.
A Son of Courage. Toronto: Allen, 1920. 284 p. 
Openway. Toronto: Musson, 1922. 233 p. 
Big John Wallace: A Romance of the Early Canadian Pioneers. Toronto: Massey-Harris Press, 1922. 47 p. 
Mates of the Tangle. Toronto: Musson, 1924. 247 p. 
Brains, Limited. Toronto: Allen, 1925. 287 p. 
Dwellers of the Marsh Realm. Chicago: Donohue, 1937. 79 p.

References

External links
 
 
 Works by Archie P. McKishnie at Internet Archive
 
 

1875 births
1946 deaths
20th-century Canadian novelists
20th-century Canadian short story writers
Canadian male novelists
People from Chatham-Kent
Writers from Ontario